Sir John Shelton (1476/7 – 1539) of Shelton in Norfolk, England, was a courtier to King Henry VIII. Through his marriage to Anne Boleyn, a sister and co-heiress of  Thomas Boleyn, 1st Earl of Wiltshire of Blickling Hall in Norfolk, he became an uncle of Queen Anne Boleyn, the second wife of King Henry VIII. He was appointed comptroller of the joint household of Princesses Mary and Elizabeth, the King's daughters, and together with his wife was Governor to the King's children.

Life

Sir John Shelton was the son of Sir Ralph Shelton (c. January 1431 – 16 July 1497) and Margaret Clere (d. 16 January 1500), daughter of Robert Clere, esquire, of Ormesby St Michael, Norfolk, and Elizabeth Uvedale, daughter of Thomas Uvedale, esquire. Sir John had four siblings: Ralph Shelton (died 1538), who married Mary Brome (d. 29 August 1540), Richard Shelton, a priest,  Elizabeth Shelton, and Alice Shelton, who married John Heveningham. The family took its name from their Norfolk manor of Shelton, and held lands in East Anglia, including Shelton Hall, for three centuries before Sir John's birth.

Before 1503, he married Anne Boleyn (c. 1483 – 8 January 1556), daughter of Sir William Boleyn of Blickling, Norfolk, and Lady Margaret Butler, daughter of Thomas Butler, 7th Earl of Ormond, and Anne Hankford. Sir John was appointed High Sheriff of Norfolk and Suffolk in 1504 and 1522, and was a Justice of the Peace for Norfolk. At the coronation of Henry VIII, Sir John was created a Knight of the Bath.

He and his wife rose to prominence when Henry VIII married, as his second wife, Lady Shelton's niece, Anne Boleyn, daughter of Lady Shelton's brother, Sir Thomas Boleyn, 1st Earl of Wiltshire. After Queen Anne's coronation in 1533, Lady Shelton and her sister, Lady Alice Clere (d. 1 November 1538), were placed in charge of the King's daughter, Mary, at Hatfield Palace. According to Block, this was likely done to pressure Mary to recognise Anne as queen. The enmity and abuse meted out to Mary contributed to everlasting hatred between the Tudor court factions.

By July 1536 Sir John was comptroller of the household established for Mary and Anne Boleyn's daughter, Elizabeth. Sir John and Lady Shelton were given the joint title of Governor and Governess of the Princess Elizabeth, responsible for her upbringing and education, after her mother's execution. In August 1536, the King was reunited with his daughters at Hunsdon House, a month after Queen Anne's beheading. There is no evidence that Shelton was involved with family intrigues or of the King's dissatisfaction. On 22 November 1538 he was granted the site of the former Carrow Abbey just outside Norwich. This property became the family seat.

Death
Shelton died on 21 December 1539 at the age of 62, and was buried in the chancel of Shelton church. He was said to have been "a man of great possessions", which he sought to pass on to his heirs contrary to the Statute of Uses. When the stratagem came to light after Shelton's death, the lawyers involved were punished, and an Act of Parliament was passed annulling such "crafty conveyances".

Issue
Shelton had three sons and seven daughters: Margaret, John, Mary, Ralph, Thomas, Anne, Gabriella, Elizabeth, Amy, and Emma. His son and heir, Sir John Shelton (b. in or before 1503, d. 1558), married Margaret, the daughter of Henry Parker, 10th Baron Morley. His daughter Anne married Edmund Knyvet. Another daughter, Margaret, married Thomas Wodehouse. His daughter, Mary, married firstly, Sir Anthony Heaveningham, and secondly, Philip Appleyard. One of his daughters, thought to be either Margaret or Mary, were said to have been a mistress of King Henry VIII.

Likenesses 
In 1528 the Shelton family sat for the court painter Hans Holbein.

Notes

References

External links
The Priory of Carrow
Sir John Shelton

Knyvet, Sir Edmund (by 1508–1551), History of Parliament
Shelton, Sir John (1509–1558), History of Parliament

1470s births
1539 deaths
People from Shelton and Hardwick
High Sheriffs of Norfolk
High Sheriffs of Suffolk
15th-century English people
16th-century English people
John
Members of Parliament for Norfolk